James Philip Craig (born 30 April 1943 in Glasgow) is a Scottish former footballer, who played as a right back. Most closely associated with Celtic, he was a member of their Lisbon Lions side which won the 1967 European Cup.

Playing career
A student at Glasgow's St Gerard's School, Craig was a Celtic supporter as a child, with the first game he attended being the Saint Mungo Cup final in 1951. He was a Scotland schoolboy international, while his first senior side was the University of Glasgow representative team which he played for while studying dentistry at the institution. He joined Celtic in 1963 on amateur terms so as to allow him to complete his studies, and having done so signed as a full professional in January 1965.

Craig's abilities and style of play matched manager Jock Stein's tactical philosophy and he soon displaced Willie O'Neill and Ian Young as Celtic's regular right back. Stein encouraged his fullbacks to overlap the side's midfield to provide additional support to the forwards, in the style of the modern wing-back role, and in Craig and left back Tommy Gemmell he found willing protagonists.

During his tenure at Parkhead, Craig collected 14 domestic honours (7 League titles, 4 Scottish Cups and 3 League Cups) as well as a European Cup medal in 1967. He made 239 appearances for Celtic scoring 6 goals with his final match being the victorious 1972 Scottish Cup Final. He won one cap for the Scotland national side.

Craig left Celtic to live in South Africa in May 1972, where he played for Hellenic FC, however after six months he returned to Britain. He joined Sheffield Wednesday, with the South Yorkshire side paying Celtic £10,000 compensation, as they had retained his registration. He retired from football in 1973, to concentrate his efforts upon his dentistry career.

Later years
In July 1974 he succeeded Shay Brennan as player-manager of Waterford United. However, in December, after one substitute appearance, Craig informed the club that he was unable to commit to the role due to a "domestic problem". In 2001, he was made Honorary President of the Belfast Shamrock Celtic Supporters Club, which subsequently changed its name to Jim Craig Celtic Supporters Club in 2011.

Craig is now actively part of the Celtic community; he has hosted Channel67, an online streaming service which provides video streams and audio streams of every Celtic match. He regularly updates the Jim Craig CSC blog site.

Personal life
Originally from Leith, his father supported local team Hibernian and the family was later to settle in Craigton, Glasgow.

His son James Craig is a notable rugby player who was capped for the Scotland national rugby union team four times between 1997–2001.

Honours
Celtic
Scottish First Division (7): 1965–66, 1966–67, 1967–68, 1968–69, 1969–70, 1970–71, 1971–72
Scottish Cup (4): 1966–67, 1968–69, 1970–71, 1971–72
Scottish League Cup (3): 1967–68, 1968–69, 1969–70 
European Cup: 1966–67
Runner-up 1969–70
Glasgow Cup: 1967–68, 1969–70

References

External links

Jim Craig CSC at Celtic Quick News
Football 50, blog series by Craig on the events of his career 50 years earlier

1943 births
Living people
Footballers from Glasgow
Alumni of the University of Glasgow
Scottish footballers
Scotland youth international footballers
Scotland international footballers
Celtic F.C. players
Hellenic F.C. players
Scottish expatriate sportspeople in South Africa
Scottish Roman Catholics
Sheffield Wednesday F.C. players
Scottish Football League players
English Football League players
Scottish expatriate footballers
Expatriate soccer players in South Africa
Scottish football managers
Waterford F.C. managers
League of Ireland managers
Association football fullbacks
Scottish dentists
Scottish Football Hall of Fame inductees
UEFA Champions League winning players
Glasgow University F.C. players